Events in the year 2020 in Papua New Guinea.

Incumbents 

 Monarch: Elizabeth II
 Governor-General: Bob Dadae
 Prime Minister: James Marape

Provincial Governors 
 Central: Robert Agarobe
 Chimbu: Micheal Dua Bogai
 East New Britain: Nakikus Konga
 East Sepik: Allan Bird
 Enga: Peter Ipatas
 Gulf: Chris Haiveta
 Hela: Philip Undialu
 Jikawa: William Tongamp
 Madang: Peter Yama
 Manus: Charlie Benjamin
 Milne Bay: Sir John Luke Crittin, KBE
 Morobe: Ginson Saonu
 New Ireland: Julius Chan
 Oro: Gary Juffa
 Sandaun: Tony Wouwou
 Southern Highlands: William Powl
 West New Britain: Sasindran Muthuvel
 Western: Taboi Awe Yoto
 Western Highlands: Paias Wingti

Events 

 20 March – The first case in of COVID-19 in the country was confirmed.
 30 January – All travelers from Asian countries were banned and the border with Indonesia was closed in order to slow the spread of the virus.

Deaths
8 September – Benedict To Varpin, 84, Roman Catholic prelate, Bishop of Bereina (1979–1987) and Archbishop of Madang (1987–2001).

References 

 
2020s in Papua New Guinea
Years of the 21st century in Papua New Guinea
Papua New Guinea
Papua New Guinea